Neoascia subannexa is a species of hoverfly in the family Syrphidae.

Distribution
Turkey.

References

Eristalinae
Insects described in 1997
Diptera of Asia